Riga–Fede disease (or syndrome) is a rare condition in infants characterized by ulceration on the ventral surface of the tongue or on the inner surface of the lower lip.  It is caused by trauma to the soft tissue from erupted baby teeth.

It can be described as a sublingual traumatic ulceration.  Although it begins as an ulceration, it may progress to a large fibrous mass with repeated trauma.

References

External links 

Oral mucosal pathology
Tongue disorders
Lip disorders